The Ministry of Development and Social Inclusion of Peru is the government ministry responsible for the implementation of social aid national programs.

It was created in 2011, during the presidency of Ollanta Humala. The inaugural minister was economist Carolina Trivelli.

, the minister is Julio Demartini.

History and function
President Ollanta Humala had initially pledged to form a Ministry of Development and Social Inclusion. However, on 18 August, the cabinet authorised the creation of the Ministry of Development and Social Inclusion, whose function would be to implement the social programmes of the government to promote "social inclusion." The ministry was created with the purpose of turning the social programmes into productive tools for the benefit of the poor.  One of its objectives is to create conditions so that beneficiaries of such social programmes as Juntos, Pension 65 and Cuna Mas, as promoted by Humala's policy of promoting social inclusion during his campaign, can use the subsidies for "financial leverage" to improve their quality of life, according to Prime Minister Salomon Lerner Ghitis.

The ministry would be in charge of some social issues that were formerly managed by either the Ministry of Women's Affairs, the cabinet, or the Ministry of Finance. The Ministry of Production would continue to be in charge of such sectors as those involving fisheries and industries.  The Ministry of Women's Affairs, however, would undergo some changes.

The inaugural minister, Kurt Burneo, said that "The idea is to centralise the social programmes. One of the current problems that has led to glaring economic losses is the fact that the social programmes are disperse." He further added that his role would entail the formulation, planning, implementation, evaluation and monitoring of the national and sectoral policy on social development and inclusion.

New social program is "The National Photovoltaic Household Electrification Program", which goal is to secure electrification for poorest people in Peru.

List of Ministers of Development and Social Inclusion

See also
AYNI Lab Social

References

Peru, Development and Social Inclusion
Development and Social Inclusion